Criley is a surname. Notable people with the surname include:

J. Michael Criley (born 1931), American medical professor
Theodore Criley (1880–1930), American hotel manager and painter